BS, B.S., Bs or bs may refer to:

Arts and entertainment
BS-, a prefix for all games broadcast for the Satellaview modem via the Japanese Broadcasting Satellite system
"B.S." (song), a song by Jhené Aiko from the album Chilombo
Team BS, French music collective founded by La Fouine that includes Fababy, Sultan and Sindy
NHK's satellite broadcaster mark, NHK-BS
Backstage (magazine)
Baritone saxophone, a musical instrument
Bullshit (card game), a card game

Businesses and organizations
, a bank in Spain 
, a bank headquartered in Spain
 Beijing Subway, a transit system
 BellSouth, a United States telephone company
 Better Serbia (Bolja Srbija), a political party in Serbia
  ("Cipher Bureau"), a Polish cryptography and signals intelligence agency known for its work on German Enigma ciphers in the 1930s
 Boy Scouts; see scouting
 British International Helicopters (IATA code BS)
 British Shipbuilders, a public corporation founded in 1977
 British Standards, produced by BSI Group
 British Sugar, a division of Associated British Foods
 Building surveyor, a professional in the construction industry concerned with setting out reference points and markers

In finance
 Venezuelan , currency of Venezuela
 Bolivian , currency of Bolivia

Places
 BS postcode area, in Bristol, England
 The Bahamas, by ISO 2-letter country code
 .bs, country-code Top Level Domain for the Bahamas
 , a city in Slovakia with the vehicle registration plate BS
 , a Swiss canton, officially abbreviated to BS
 , a town in Germany, also known in English as Brunswick, with the vehicle registration plate BS
 , a city and province of Italy with the vehicle registration plate BS
 , a city in Poland with the vehicle registration plate BS

In science and technology

Computing and telecommunications
Bs (programming language)
Backspace, and the backspace control character in the C0 control code set
Base transceiver station, or base station, a node in a mobile telephony network
Bubble sort, a sorting algorithm
Boot sector, a memory region containing machine code, generally used for booting an operating system
BotServ, an IRC bot server
BraveSentry, a clone of the SpySheriff malware program
Broadcasting Satellite (Japanese), a system of Japanese communication satellites

Medicine
Bachelor of Surgery, an academic degree
Bernard–Soulier syndrome, a rare autosomal recessive coagulopathy, that is caused a deficiency of glycoprotein Ib
Bartter syndrome, a rare inherited disease which results in hypokalemia

Other uses in science and technology
Bachelor of Science, an academic degree
Behavioural sciences
Brake-specific fuel consumption, a measure of engine fuel efficiency
Bright Star Catalogue, which lists all stars of stellar magnitude 6.5 or brighter
Bronshtein and Semendyayev, a handbook of mathematics
Strange B meson, a subatomic particle, symbol 
The Köppen climate classification code for a semi-arid climate

In sport
The Bs, a 19th-century cricket team
British Shooting, the governing body for target shooting in Great Britain
British Showjumping, the governing body for showjumping in Great Britain
Blocked Shot, in basketball statistics, see Block (basketball)
Blown Save, in baseball statistics, see Save (baseball)

Other uses
 Bullshit, a phrase denoting something worthless
 Bengali Sambat, used to mark years in the Bengali calendar
 Big Sister (disambiguation)
 Bikram Sambat, a calendar used in Nepal
 Bosnian language (ISO 639 alpha-2 code bs)
 Broad Street (disambiguation)
 Bronze Star Medal, a United States military award
  (Institute of consecrated life), a Roman Catholic monastic Order

See also
 B (disambiguation), where "Bs" may refer to the plural of "B"